The Street is an American police drama that aired in syndication five nights a week in 1988. A total of 65 thirty-minute episodes were produced.

Synopsis
Filmed on location in Newark, New Jersey and other northern New Jersey cities, The Street was filmed mostly at night with handheld cameras which gave it a documentary look. The series followed two sets of patrolmen, Officers Bud Peluso and Arthur Scolari, who used patrol car 260 on the 3:00 pm to 11:00 pm shift, and Officers Jack Runyon and Sheppard Scott, who used the same car from 11:00 pm to 7:00 am. Stories centered on the officers lives on and off-duty.

The Street used frank language and had gritty, adult subject matter. As a result, the program had an on-screen warning and was run after 11:00 pm on most stations.

Cast
 Bruce MacVittie as Officer Bud Peluso
 Stanley Tucci as Officer Arthur Scolari
 Ron J. Ryan as Officer Jack Runyon
 Michael Beach as Officer Sheppard Scott

References

External links

1988 American television series debuts
1988 American television series endings
First-run syndicated television programs in the United States
Television shows set in New Jersey
Television shows filmed in New Jersey
English-language television shows